Slakovec is a village in Međimurje County, Croatia. It had a population of 559 in the 2011 census.

The village is part of the Nedelišće municipality. It is easily accessible via road and is located around 8 kilometres from the centre of Čakovec, the county seat and largest city of Međimurje County. The village is largely surrounded by forests. The surroundings also include some agricultural fields and farms, as well as two ponds.

References

Populated places in Međimurje County